Sangre may refer to:
 Sangre, a fictional Earth-like planet in the science fiction novel The Men in the Jungle by Norman Spinrad
 Sangre (comics), the de facto leader of the Marvel Comics supervillain group Children of the Vault
Sangre (film), a 2005 Mexican drama film.
 Sangre (Thalía song), a song by the Mexican singer Thalía.
Licania platypus, a tree native to Central America

See also 
 Sangre de Cristo (disambiguation)
 Preciosa Sangre (disambiguation)